Ortho-McNeil-Janssen Pharmaceuticals, Inc is a healthcare company of Johnson & Johnson composed of two divisions:
 Ortho-McNeil, based in Raritan, NJ (United States); the division is focused on primary care.
 Janssen, based in Beerse (Belgium); formerly Janssen Pharmaceutica; the division is focused on mental health.

After some suits against Ortho-McNeil, Johnson & Johnson came to an agreement about the future of this subsidiary branch, now known as Janssen Pharmaceuticals.

See also
 Biotech and pharmaceutical companies in the New York metropolitan area

External links
 Janssen Pharmaceuticals Official Site

Johnson & Johnson subsidiaries